HDFC Life Insurance Company Ltd. (d/b/a HDFC Life) is a long-term life insurance provider with its headquarters in Mumbai, offering individual and group insurance services and it was incorporated on 14 August 2000.

History 
The company is a joint venture between Housing Development Finance Corporation Ltd (HDFC), one of India's leading housing finance institutions and Abrdn, a global investment company. As of 31 March 2020, the promoters; HDFC Ltd. and Standard Life (Mauritius Holdings) 2006 Ltd. hold a 51.69% and 34.75% stake in HDFC Life respectively. The remaining equity is held by public shareholders.

HDFC Life obtained the certificate of commencement of business on 12 October 2000 and a certificate of registration from Insurance Regulatory and Development Authority of India (IRDAI) to undertake the life insurance business on 23 October 2000. HDFC Life has 421 branches and is present in 980+ cities, villages, and towns in India and supported by 16,544 employees. The company has also established a liaison office in Dubai.

HDFC Life distributes its products through a multi-channel network consisting of Insurance agents, Bancassurance partners (HDFC Bank, Saraswat Bank, RBL Bank), a Direct channel, Insurance Brokers, MFIs (Micro Finance Institutions), SFBs (Small Finance Banks), etc. and 39 partnerships within non-traditional ecosystems and an Online Insurance Platform and currently  one of the leading financial service providers in India offering finance in varied sectors like housing, banking, life insurance and general insurance, asset management and education loans and many other products.

Products and services
HDFC Life's products include Protection, Pension, Savings, Investment, Health along with Children and Women plans. The company also provides an option of customizing the plans, by adding optional benefits called riders, at an additional price. The company has categorized its product portfolio covering five principal segments across the individual and group categories namely participating, non-participating protection term, non-participating protection health, other non-participating and unit-linked insurance products. The company currently has 37 retail and 11 group products, along with 6 optional rider benefits (as on 24 March 2020).

 Protection Plans – insurance plans that provide protection and financial stability to the family in case of any unforeseen events.
 Click2Protect life is their online term plan.
 Launched CSC Suraksha to be sold exclusively through the Common Services Centre network.
 Click2Invest is their online ULIP investment plan.
 Health Plan – offers financial security to meet health-related contingencies.
 Savings & Investment plans – These plans help in investment to achieve financial goals.
 Retirement plans – financial security for life post-retirement.
 Women's plans – plans catering to different financial needs of women.
 Children's plans – plans meant to secure children's future.
 Rural & social Plans – meant specifically for rural customers.
 Click2Retire completed their Click2 portfolio.
 ULIP Investment with more funds.

Key people
The MD & CEO of the company is Vibha Padalkar. The Deputy Managing Director is Suresh Badami. The Chief Financial Officer is Niraj Shah. The Chief Investment Officer is Prasun Gajri. Vibhash Naik heads human resources, admin and learning & development.

Corporate history
The Insurance Regulatory and Development Authority (IRDA) was constituted in 1999 as an autonomous body to regulate and develop the insurance industry. The IRDA opened up the market in August 2000 with the invitation for application for registrations. HDFC Life was established in 2000 becoming the first private sector life insurance company in India.

By 2001, the company had its 100th customer, strengthened its employee force to 100, and had settled its first claim. HDFC Life launched its first TV advertising campaign 'Sar Utha Ke Jiyo' in 2005.
In 2006, a study conducted by the Brand Equity – Economic Times had put HDFC Life at 29th rank in the most trusted Indian Brands amongst the Top 50 Service Brands of 2010.

The Insurance Regulatory and Development Authority (IRDA) gave accreditation to HDFC Life for 149 training centres housed in its branches to cater to the mandatory training required to be given as well as for other sales training requirements in 2009.

In 2012, it is the first private life insurance company to bring back pension plans under the new regulatory regime, with the launch of two pension plans – HDFC Life Pension Super Plus and HDFC Life Single Premium Pension Super, operating the pension fund business under the National Pension System and is the second largest private pension fund management company in India in terms of assets under management and subscribers in Fiscal 2017. The company turned profitable in fiscal 2012 posting annual profit of Rs 271 crore and in December 2013 it declared a maiden dividend for its shareholders and in 2014 the company's Assets Under Management (AUM) crossed Rs 50000 crore mark.

In the year 2016, Standard Life Mauritius increases its stake in the HDFC Life from 26% to 35% and in Fiscal 2016 the latter establishes the first international subsidiary in the UAE, HDFC International to operate the reinsurance business which signs reinsurance treaties for two distinct lines of individual life business and enters into arrangements to offer reinsurance services for group and credit life schemes and expects the pension and reinsurance business to help them diversify its sources of revenue and profitability in future years.

By 2017, it was the country's third-largest private sector life insurance company with a 16.5 percent share of total private-sector premiums for the Financial Year 2017 and fourth largest in the life insurance industry based on premium earned and had 66,372 individual agents across India, comprising 6.8 percent of total private agents in the Indian life insurance industry and entered into 125 banking tie-ups including HDFC Bank giving it access to a huge branch network.

Till 2019, the insurance firm had insured 21.6 million lives in both individual and group segments, and has one of the highest margins in the business, with 24.3 percent in first half of the financial year 2019, and is regarded as one of the most consistent life insurance firms delivering efficient returns on operating Earning Value(EV) of 20 per cent for the last three consecutive financial years.

Associated companies
HDFC Life's associated companies include HDFC Ltd, HDFC Bank, HDFC International Life and Re Company Limited, HDFC Pension, HDFC MF, HDFC Sales, HDFC Ergo, HDB Financial Services (HDBFS), HDFC Securities, HDFC RED, HDFC Ventures Trustee Company, GRUH Finance, HDFC Trustee Company, HDFC Developers, HDFC Property Ventures, HDFC Investments, Credit Information Bureau (India) Ltd.

Milestones
The following are the major steps of the organisation from the date of its inception:

2022 - January - Acquisition of Exide Life Insurance, after approval from Competition Commission of India and Insurance Regulatory and Development Authority of India.

2021 - September - Took 100% stake in Exide Life Insurance

2020- November-Launched combi product ‘Click 2 Protect Corona Kavach’ to provide financial protection package to customers in collaboration with HDFC Ergo.

September-Entered into a Corporate Agency (CA) arrangement with YES Bank Limited to offer life insurance to the bank's customers.

June- Partnered firm HDFC Ergo tied up with tech firm Tropogo with the plan to offer commercial drone owners and operators third-party insurance liability cover for any property damages and physical injuries arising through flying machines.

2018-Selected as one of the 100 Best Companies for Women in India.

2017-Assets under Management(AUM) crossed Rs. 100,000 crore (US$13.82 billion); completed successful IPO  with planned subscription of Rs 9000 crores.

Selected as one of the 100 Best Companies for Women in India.

2016-Total premium crosses Rs 16000 crore.

2014-First time the company declares dividends to shareholders and its AUM crosses Rs 50000 crore.

2012- The Company starts earning profits.

2011-HDFC Pension,its subsidiary incorporated by Company.

2010-Company's Assets Under Management (AUM) crosses Rs 20000 crore (US$4.37 billion).

2007-Crosses 5,00,000 total policies under various categories.

2004-Started unit linked products and funds. Entered into distribution collaboration with Saraswat Co-operative Bank Limited.

2003-Crosses 1,00,000 total policies under various categories and 1000 individual agents.

2001-Receives License from Insurance Regulatory Development Authority of India(IRDAI) as first Private Insurance Company.

As per the report based on a study conducted by The Economic Times and Great Places to Work Institute, for some years in a row, the company was adjudged one of India's best companies to work for in India's Best Companies to Work report.

References

Financial services companies based in Mumbai
Life insurance companies of India
Insurance companies of India
Financial services companies established in 2000
NIFTY 50
HDFC Group
2000 establishments in Maharashtra
Indian companies established in 2000
Companies listed on the National Stock Exchange of India
Companies listed on the Bombay Stock Exchange